Hein van de Geyn (born 18 July 1956) is a jazz double bassist, composer and band leader from the Netherlands. Van de Geyn also teaches double bass and music.

Early life
Hein van de Geyn was born in Schijndel, Netherlands on 18 July 1956. He studied classical violin for 15 years and started on electric bass guitar when a teenager. He studied classical music at a Tilburg conservatory from 1974 to 1979, and then jazz double bass at a Rotterdam conservatory until 1980.

Career
He lived and worked in Seattle in 1980 and San Francisco the following year. He returned to Europe in 1983. He began playing with Philip Catherine in 1985. Van de Geyn toured with Chet Baker between 1985 and 1988, including Japan in 1987. Another multi-year association was with Dee Dee Bridgewater (1988–96). In 1990 he recorded with Lee Konitz; the two also played as a duo during the following two years. In 1994 he formed the band Baseline with John Abercrombie and Joe LaBarbera.

Also in 1994, Van de Geyn co-founded the jazz label Challenge Records, for which he was in charge of artists and repertoire. "Challenge Jazz was spun out from the parent and has been owned since 2005 by Hein van de Geyn. Challenge also offers a booking arm, New Arts Agency, which focuses on bringing label artists to venues and festivals in the Benelux region of Europe."

In 1996 he became head of the bass section in the jazz department of the Royal Conservatory of The Hague.

Awards and honors
 1978 Best Soloist, Laren Jazz Competition
 1996 Prins Bernhard Music Award
 1998 Bird Award, North Sea Jazz Festival
 1998 Best European Bass Player, RTBF and VRT

Discography

As leader
 Hein van de Geyn Meets Lee Konitz (September, 1990)
 Why Really with Baseline (Challenge, 1994)
 Standards with Baseline (Challenge, 1995)
 Returns with Baseline (Challenge, 1996)
 Woodwind Works (Challenge, 2000)
 Deja Vu with Baseline (Challenge, 2000)
 The Long Journey with Jean-Michel Pilc (A-Records, 2001)
 The Guitar Album with Baseline (Challenge, 2006)
 Meeting Again with Lee Konitz (Challenge, 2007)

As sideman
With Chet Baker
 Hazy Hugs (Challenge, 1985) with Amstel Octet
 Chet's Choice (Criss Cross, 1985) with Philip Catherine
 Memories (King, 1987)
 Four (King, 1987)
 Almost Blue (Chet Baker in Tokyo) (1987)
With Dee Dee Bridgewater
 In Montreux (Polydor, 1992)
 Keeping Tradition (Verve, 1993)
 Love and Peace: A Tribute to Horace Silver (Verve, 1994)
With Deborah Brown
 Euroboppin with Johnny Griffin (Alfa, 1986) 
 International Incident (33 Jazz, 1994)
With Philip Catherine
 Transparence (Inakustic, 1986)
 Oscar (Igloo, 1988)
 September Sky (September, 1988)
 I Remember You (Criss Cross, 1991)
 Moods Volume I (Criss Cross, 1992)
 Moods Volume II (Criss Cross, 1992)
 Live (Dreyfus, 1996)
 Blue Prince (Dreyfus, 2000)
 Concert in Cap Breton (Dreyfus, 2010)
With Tete Montoliu
 Catalonian Rhapsody (Alfa Jazz, 1992)
 Music for Ana (Mas, 1992)
With Enrico Pieranunzi
 Seaward (Soul Note, 1995)
 Don't Forget the Poet (Challenge, 1999)
 Music of Wayne Shorter (Challenge, 2000)
 Improvised Forms (Challenge, 2000)
 Alone Together with Philip Catherine (Challenge, 2000) 
 Live in Paris (Challenge, 2001)
With Toots Thielemans
 Chez Toots (Private Music, 1996)
 Live (Challenge, 2007)
With others
 Tommy Flanagan and Hank Jones, Live in Marciac (TCB, 1993)
 Johnny Griffin, Live at the Bim House (Challenge, 1999) 
 Lee Konitz, Dialogues (Challenge, 1997)
 Joe Lovano, Solid Steps (Jazz Club, 1986)
 Jeanfrançois Prins with Fred Hersch and Judy Niemack, Beauty and the Prince (AMC, 1993)
 Larry Schneider, Milanka (Timeless, 1987)
 Bobby Watson, In the Groove (Challenge, 1999)
 Kenny Werner, Collaboration (Challenge, 2012)
 Kenny Wheeler, California Daydream (Musidisc, 1991)

As producer
With John Abercrombie
 That's for Sure (Challenge, 2000) with Kenny Wheeler
 Brand New (Challenge, 2003) with Kenny Wheeler
 Topics (Challenge, 2006)

With Nat Adderley
 Good Company (Challenge, 1994)

With Bob Brookmeyer
 Walzing With Zoe (Challenge, 2001)
 Get Well Soon (Challenge, 2003)

With Philip Catherine
 Live (Dreyfus, 1996)
 Cole Porter Songbook (Challenge, 2010)
 Guitars Two (Dreyfus, 2007)
 Cote Jardin (Challenge, 2012)

With Harmen Fraanje
 Sonatala (Challenge, 2003)
 Ronja (Challenge, 2006)

With Denise Jannah
 A Heart Full of Music (Timeless, 1993)

With Rick Margitza
 Hands of Time (Challenge, 1994)
 Game of Chance (Challenge, 1996)

With Enrico Pieranunzi
 Daedalus' Wings (Challenge, 1999)

With Clark Terry
 Shades of Blue (Challenge, 1994)

With Jasper van 't Hof
 Tomorrowland (Challenge, 1996) 
 Un Mondo Illusorio (Challenge, 1998)
 Un Incontro Illusorio (Challenge, 2000) with Joey Baron

With Eric Vloeimans
 First Floor (Challenge, 1994)
 Bestarium (Challenge, 1996) 
 Bitches and Fairy Tales (Challenge, 1998)
 Umai (Challenge, 2000)
 Hidden History (Challenge, 2002)
 Fujimundi (Challenge, 2003) 
 Summersault (Challenge, 2005) 
 Gatecrashin' (Challenge, 2006)
 Hyper (Challenge, 2006)
 Heavens Above! (Challenge, 2008)
 Live at Yoshi's (Challenge, 2008)

References

External links
 Official site

1956 births
Living people
Dutch composers
Dutch jazz composers
Dutch jazz double-bassists
Dutch jazz bandleaders
People from Schijndel
21st-century double-bassists
Codarts University for the Arts alumni